Carter Ridge is a high and mountainous ridge,  long, located between Coral Sea Glacier and Elder Glacier, in the Victory Mountains of Victoria Land. It was mapped by the New Zealand Geological Survey Antarctic Expedition, 1957–58, and the United States Geological Survey, 1960–62. It was named by the Advisory Committee on Antarctic Names for American chemist Herbert E. Carter, a member of the National Science Board, National Science Foundation, 1964–72, and chairman, 1970–72.

References 

Ridges of Victoria Land
Borchgrevink Coast